Buenas noches, Buenos Aires is a 1964  Argentine musical film comedy directed by and starring Hugo del Carril. The film was premièred in Buenos Aires on October 10, 1964.

Organized by Del Carril, the film reminisces over the culture of tango films that dominated the Cinema of Argentina in the 1930s, 1940s and 1950s, and united tango actors such as Hugo del Carril, Tito Lusiardo and Virginia Luque and Roberto Escalada as well as starring new actors such as Palito Ortega.

Cast

Hugo del Carril
Beba Bidart
Los Cantores de Salavina
Los Cinco Latinos
Roberto Escalada
Néstor Fabián
Ramona Galarza
Roberto Grela
Los Hermanos Abalos
Constanza Hool
Elizabeth Killian
Ambar La Fox
Susy Leiva
Virginia Luque
Tito Lusiardo
Ubaldo Martínez
Mariano Mores
Palito Ortega
Antonio Prieto
Los Quilla-Huasi
Pedrito Rico
Violeta Rivas
Jorge Sobral
Julio Sosa
Aníbal Troilo
Argentinita Vélez
Enzo Viena
Víctor Ayos
Antonio Prieto

Plot

External links
 

1964 films
Argentine musical comedy films
1960s Spanish-language films
Tango films
1964 musical comedy films
Films directed by Hugo del Carril
Films shot in Buenos Aires
Films set in Buenos Aires
1960s Argentine films